Pictonia is an extinct ammonoid cephalopod genus belonging to the family Aulacostephanidae. These fast-moving nektonic carnivores lived during the Jurassic period, Kimmeridgian age (from 152.1 to 157.3 mya).

Species
Species within this genus include:
Pictonia baylei
Pictonia densicostata
Pictonia gracilis
Pictonia seminudata

Distribution
Fossils of species within this genus have been found in the Jurassic sediments of Germany, Russia and United Kingdom.

References

Ammonitida genera
Jurassic ammonites
Ammonites of Europe
Aulacostephanidae